Sadhvi Nisha Rithambara is a Hindu nationalist ideologue and the founder-chairperson of Durga Vahini.

Early life
Sadhvi Rithambhara was born as Nisha Ritambara in at Doraha town in Ludhiana district of Punjab.

She got her diksha from  Swami Paramanand, at the age of sixteen and having become his disciple, followed him to his ashram in Haridwar and then, in his tours across India, while being primarily trained in oratory.

She entered the Sangh Parivar as a member of the Rashtriya Sevika Samiti, the women's arm of the Rashtriya Swayamsevak Sangh (RSS).

Activism
Sadhvi Rithambara gained public prominence through her roles in the Vishwa Hindu Parishad (VHP).
She has opened several centers for women empowerment and her first center was in Jwala Nagar, Delhi, 2003. 
In her ashram, for the safety of women, arrangements have been made for the training of horse riding, gun handling, aerial firing, karate etc. She also runs orphanages and ashrams for widows. Their ashrams are in places like Delhi and Himachal Pradesh
 
People also address her by calling her Didi and Maa.

Speeches 
During 1989–1992, Sadhvi Rithambara disseminated several powerful public speeches urging Hindus to fight for their rights in the country if needed. She played a major role in the Movement for A temple at the place of birth of Lord Rama; In the process, addressing several large scale rallies which brought her to the star light of the campaigns involving BJP and other Right-wing institutions and controversies too.

She was one of the three key women leaders of the movement, the other two being Uma Bharati and Vijayaraje Scindia; their leadership was largely responsible for the involvement of women in the movement and the form it took.

Scholars note that she operated far outside the traditional boundaries of feminine domains.

Election campaigns 
Rithambara's skills at oratory made her a star-campaigner for Bharatiya Janata Party in both the 1989 and 1991 Lok Sabha elections and several state-legislature elections.

Demolition of Babri Majid 
On 6 December 1992, a large group of Vishva Hindu Parishad activists and allied organisations demolished the Babri Masjid mosque in Uttar Pradesh. 

Sadhvi Rithambara was present during the demolition, cheering the crowd whilst standing atop the terrace of the Masjid.{{efn|Contemporary news reports noted her exhorting Hindu volunteers through sloganing -- 'Ek dhakka aur do, Babri Masjid tor do [Give one more push, bring down Babri Masjid].}} Three days after the demolition, she was arrested on grounds of inciting communal tension.

 Legal Trials 
The Liberhan Commission that probed the Babri Masjid demolition held Sadhvi Ritambhara along with sixty-eight others of being individually culpable for leading the country "to the brink of communal discord" for their role in the demolition of the Babri Masjid on 6 December 1992.

A CBI court framed criminal charges against Rithambara in May, 2017.

On 30 September 2020, she along with other 32 accused people, were acquitted in the Babri Masjid Demolition Case by CBI special court.

Later activities
She retreated from her public role, soon after the demolition and kept a relatively low profile for a few years.

In 1993, Sadhvi Rithambara attempted to establish an ashram near Vrindavan and Mathura on land that the Uttar Pradesh BJP government had granted her for a minimal fee. However, the proposal fell through as the Kalyan Singh-led government was dismissed, and she was not allowed to take possession of the land by the subsequent Mulayam Singh Yadav led state government. In 2002, the state government led by Chief Minister Ram Prakash Gupta granted 17 hectares of land in the area, valued at Rupee 200 million, to her Paramshaktipeth'' trust for 99 years for an annual fee of one rupee for this philanthropic cause. Besides cultivating devotion in women, the Vrindavan Ashram has also imparted training in karate, horse-riding, handling air guns and pistols, with the stated aim of relieving the women from their traditional societal roles and making them confident and self-reliant. She also runs ashrams for unwanted infants, ladies and widows in Indore, Delhi and Himachal Pradesh.

In April 1995, Rithambara was arrested in Indore for inciting communal passions, after she referred to Mother Teresa as a "magician", in the course of a speech denouncing Christian missionaries, who she alleged were converting Hindus. Rithambara's address sparked off a riot and led to several arson, leading to the arrest of 169 people. During the 1995 Gujarat elections, she returned to the campaigning fold for BJP and alleged about a Hindu-phobic attitude of Congress (I); this helped in mobilizing public electoral sentiments, especially that VHP was banned in Gujarat. She was arrested, soon after.

Notes

References

Hindu activists
20th-century Hindu religious leaders
Rashtriya Swayamsevak Sangh members
Living people
Indian Hindu nuns
Vishva Hindu Parishad members
Durga Vahini members
People from Ludhiana
Far-right politicians in India
Year of birth missing (living people)
People charged with crimes